Patrick Chapman (born 1968), is an Irish poet, writer and screenwriter.

Patrick or Pat Chapman may also refer to:

Patrick Chapman (food writer)
Pat Chapman (footballer), Patricia Chapman

See also
Patsy Chapman